Ceriano Laghetto is a  (municipality) in the Province of Monza and Brianza in the Italian region Lombardy, located about  northwest of Milan.

It is served by two railway stations: Ceriano Laghetto-Solaro and Ceriano Laghetto-Groane.

References

External links
 Official website